The Aquarium of Niagara is a non-profit public aquarium dedicated to education and conservation of aquatic life. Originally privately owned and founded by a group of chemists and other scientists, it opened on June 12, 1965. Ownership was transferred to a non-profit foundation, the Sea Research Foundation, in 1977, and then to the Niagara Aquarium Foundation on February 18, 1994. The Aquarium is located in downtown Niagara Falls, New York, near Niagara Falls State Park. The Aquarium features rescued seals and sea lions, Humboldt penguins, sharks, jellyfish, and over 128 species of mammals, fish, birds, and reptiles. The Aquarium of Niagara is accredited by the Association of Zoos and Aquariums.

The Niagara Aquarium Foundation is governed by a Board of Trustees. The Board of Trustees appoints an Executive Director who has immediate charge and control of the administration and operation of the Aquarium. The Aquarium of Niagara is currently under the direction of Gary K. Siddall, who was hired for the role of Executive Director in June 2016.

Major exhibits 
The Aquarium of Niagara is home to over 128 species of animals, including:

 California sea lions
 Harbor seals
 Gray seals
 Humboldt penguins
 Jellyfish
 Freshwater and marine fish and invertebrates

Programming 
Experiences included with regular admission include sea lions shows, seal presentations, penguin feedings and educational talks with Aquarium team members.  Experiences available for an additional cost include:

 Seal encounters
 Penguin encounters
 Trainer for a day program
 Birthday parties
 Sleepover programs
 Summer camps

The Aquarium of Niagara also offers field trips, outreach programing, home school classes, and scout badge workshops that are all aligned with the Aquarium's core values and mission statement, which advocate education and conservation of aquatic life.

References

External links

Aquarium of Niagara (official website)
Aquarium of Niagara (Niagara Falls State Park)
Reviews at TripAdvisor

Aquaria in New York (state)
Buildings and structures in Niagara Falls, New York